The Lost Boys are characters from J. M. Barrie's 1904 play Peter Pan, or The Boy Who Wouldn't Grow Up and later adaptations and extensions to the story. They are boys "who fall out of their prams when the nurse is looking the other way and if they are not claimed in seven days, they are sent far away to the Neverland," where Peter Pan is their captain.

There are no "lost girls" because, as Peter explains, girls are far too clever to fall out of their prams.

Original Lost Boys 

Tootles is described as the most unfortunate and humblest of the band, because "the big things" and adventures happen while "he has stepped round the corner." This however has not soured  but sweetened his nature. He is the one who shoots Wendy with a bow and arrow after Tinker Bell tells them Wendy is a bird that Peter wants killed. When Tootles realises his mistake, he asks Peter to kill him. Wendy however survives, and Tootles is spared. Tootles is the first to defend Wendy when she wants to return to London. When Peter takes possession of "The Jolly Roger," Captain Hook's pirate ship, Tootles takes Smee's place as boatswain. At the end of the novel, he returns to London with Wendy and the other lost boys and eventually grows up to become a judge.

Nibs is described as happy and debonair, possibly the bravest Lost Boy. The only thing he remembers about his mother is that she always wanted a cheque book and says he would love to give her one—if he knew what it was. He grows up to work in an office.

Slightly is described as the most conceited of the boys, because he believes that he remembers what life was like before he was "lost." However, most of his "memories" are based on misunderstandings: for example, he claims to know what his last name is because his pinafore had the words "Slightly Soiled" written on the tag. Slightly is a poor make-believer, but he does seem to have a talent for music; he is described as cutting whistles and flutes from the branches of trees and dancing to tunes he creates himself. He grows up to marry into nobility and become a lord.

Curly is described by Barrie as "a pickle" (a person who gets into pickles) and has curly hair, hence his name. He isn't very smart but is very loveable. Curly is also a little timid but has a kind heart. Curly grows up to work in an office.

The Twins — First and Second Twin know little about themselves as they are not allowed to because Peter Pan does not know what Twins are, and no Lost Boy is allowed to know anything that Peter doesn't. The Twins grow up to work in an office.

Adaptations in literature

Peter and the Starcatchers 
In the Peter and the Starcatchers series, an earlier group of Lost Boys include boys whom Peter knew from St. Norbert's orphanage, and who return to England with the heroine's family at the end of the prequels. This description does not concord with the canon backstory for the Lost Boys, who are not orphaned, but lost as babies.

 Prentiss — A rather new boy at St. Norbert's.
 James — James seems to be closer to Peter than any other boy at St. Norbert's. He serves as the leader to the Lost Boys when Peter is not around, making him the second-in-command.
 Tubby Ted — As a running gag, Tubby Ted is always hungry.
 Thomas — A boy from St. Norbert's.

In Peter and the Secret of Rundoon, some other boys from St. Norbert's, who used to be slaves for King Zarboff, end up going to Neverland with Peter. They have the same names as J. M. Barrie's original Lost Boys. By the end of the novel, Prentiss, James, Tubby Ted, and Thomas decide to go back to London with Leonard Aster because they realize they would become men some day and cannot keep up with Peter forever. They leave for the real world and all grow up. Peter and Tinker Bell take in the new, more familiar Lost Boys. However, Peter is reunited with James, who has grown up, in the fourth novel, Peter and the Sword of Mercy.

Peter Pan in Scarlet 
In Peter Pan in Scarlet, Tootles  becomes a girl because he only has daughters to borrow clothes from in order to become a child again and go back to Neverland. He finds his father, who is a judge, too.

Nibs is the only Lost Boy not to return to Neverland because he can't bear the thought of leaving his children. Because of this he also is the only one who never meets his real parents, stays an orphan and has no chance to learn anything of his earlier life.

Slightly plays the clarinet and saves the day a couple of times with his music. Slightly grows up to marry a noblewoman and becomes a lord, though he has become a widower at the age of thirty and is the only one of the Lost Boys not to father any children. He gets tricked by the new enemy when he returns to Neverland and grows up, much to Peter's anger. Thanks to his love for music he finds his real mother and after returning to London he is the only Lost Boy who doesn't return to his adult age, but stays eighteen and stays with his mother.

Curly has become a doctor and is the owner of one of Nana's great-great-puppies, which travels with him to Neverland. He is the one who gives up his youth and childhood to save Peter's life.

The Twins have grown up to work in an office and their names are revealed to be Marmaduke and Binky. They find their mother and take her back to their house in London.

Adaptations in film

Disney's Peter Pan films 

In their appearances in the Disney franchise, the Lost Boys are often named after their animal costumes: Fox/Slightly, Rabbit/Nibs, Bear/Cubby, Skunk/Tootles, and the Raccoons/Twins. In Disney's first Peter Pan film (1953), the Boys play smaller roles and are less characterized, appearing more as a group than individually. In Return to Neverland, they are named as their original counterparts (with the exception of Cubby). Tootles is silent in both films, communicating with a pad and pencil in the latter film.

In Barrie's original works, the Lost Boys leave Neverland and grow up, while in the Disney films they are merely tempted to, but change their minds and choose to remain with Peter Pan. In Return to Neverland, which takes place many years later, they are still with Peter, and have remained children.

In the 2023 live-action remake Peter Pan & Wendy, the Lost Boys are depicted as being more diverse, including girls, people of color, and mentally handicapped or disabled children.

Spielberg's Hook 
In Spielberg's sequel Hook (1991), there are at least two dozen Lost Boys of various ethnicity living in Neverland, whose clothes suggest that they left various civilisations at different times over the past century. They live in a giant tree on a tall rocky outcropping just offshore of the island. Twins are seen wearing Boy Scout uniforms. The Lost Boys named in the film are:

 Rufio (Dante Basco),
 Thud Butt (Raushan Hammond),
 Pockets (Isaiah Robinson),
 Ace (Jasen Fisher),
 Don't Ask (James Madio),
 Too Small (Thomas Tulak),
 Latchboy (Alex Zuckerman), including
 No Nap (Ahmad Stoner).

The boys are led by Rufio, who was hand-chosen by Peter as leader when he left Neverland to grow up as "Peter Banning." Initially, Rufio refuses to believe that Peter Banning is their former leader, as do most of the boys. However, Tinker Bell and the glimpse of Peter Pan that Pockets sees in Banning's face convince them and they train him for a showdown with Captain Hook. The Lost Boys gradually come to believe in Peter, a turning point being when he manages to beat Rufio in a heated name-calling match. When Peter finally relearns how to fly, Rufio finally recognizes Peter is indeed Peter Pan and gives Peter the sword as a sign of apology and respect. The Lost Boys follow Peter into a climactic battle with Captain Hook and the pirates, armed with improvised childlike weapons. Rufio valiantly takes on Hook while Peter rescues his daughter, Maggie. Hook fatally stabs Rufio, who dies in Peter's arms and declares he regarded Peter as a father. Peter's son Jack, witnessing Rufio's death at the hands of Hook, turns away from the life of a pirate and reconciles with his father. Peter and Hook engage in a duel which culminates in Hook apparently being eaten alive by the momentarily resurrected crocodile that had eaten Hook's hand long ago. Before leaving Neverland, Peter selects Thud Butt to be their new leader, telling him "I want you to take care of everyone who is smaller than you," to which Thud Butt agrees.

Tootles appears as an old man. He was one of the many "orphans" whom Granny Wendy is said to have found homes for over the decades. He now lives with Wendy because she could not bear to send him to a retirement home. However, he is the first to recognise that Hook has arrived in London and witnesses him abduct the children. He also knows that Peter Banning is Peter Pan and remembers him just as much as Granny Wendy. After Peter and his family arrive at Wendy's house, Peter sees him crawling on the floor, and he explains "I've lost my marbles," which Peter Banning readily agrees with. Later in Neverland, Thud Butt gives Peter a small bag containing Tootles' marbles, revealing that they were his happy thoughts and he lost them literally rather than metaphorically. Once Peter and his children return home, Peter gives Tootles his marbles and rejoices. With the help of some fairy dust that spills out of the bag, he flies out of the window to return to Neverland.

P.J. Hogan's Peter Pan 
In the 2003 film Peter Pan, the Lost Boys appear with their original names. They are played by:

 Theodore Chester as Slightly
 Rupert Simonian as Tootles
 George MacKay as Curly
 Harry Eden as Nibs
 Patrick Gooch and Lachlan Gooch as Twins.

In the film, the characters retain their personalities. In the end, all of them are adopted by Mr. and Mrs. Darling, like in the original play, except Slightly, who instead is adopted by Aunt Millicent.

Other films 
The title of the 1987 film The Lost Boys is a reference to Peter Pan's Lost Boys. In the film, the characters retain their youth and gain their powers, including flying, by becoming vampires.

The Lost Boys appear at the end of Pan (2015). Peter rescues Nibs and many other boys from an orphanage so they can have some "fun." They are pulled on to the flying Jolly Roger and Hook refers to them as "Lost Boys."

Adaptations in other media 
Two of the Lost Boys, Cubby and Slightly, appear alongside Peter Pan and Tinker Bell in Kingdom Hearts Birth by Sleep. Before that, the Lost Boys appeared in the Kingdom Hearts manga as comic relief, fighting Donald Duck over some treasure they found in Captain Hook's ship.

The Lost Boys appear in the Season 2 finale and in the first episodes of Season 3 of Once Upon a Time. They are the murderous inhabitants of Neverland and servants of Peter Pan, portrayed by Robbie Kay. The death of Rufio is briefly mentioned by Captain Hook during a fight in the second episode.

Cubby made a cameo appearance in Chip 'n Dale: Rescue Rangers voiced by Rachel Bloom.

References

External links 

 

Theatre characters introduced in 1904
Peter Pan characters
Child characters in literature
Child characters in film
Male characters in literature
Male characters in film
Sidekicks in literature
Film sidekicks
Fictional English people